Fellerer is a German surname. Notable people with the surname include:

Karl Gustav Fellerer (1902–1984), German musicologist
Leopold Fellerer (1919–1968), Vienna-born German fighter pilot

German-language surnames